In physics, polaritons  are quasiparticles resulting from strong coupling of electromagnetic waves with an electric or magnetic dipole-carrying excitation. They are an expression of the common quantum phenomenon known as level repulsion, also known as the avoided crossing principle. Polaritons describe the crossing of the dispersion of light with any interacting resonance. To this extent polaritons can also be thought of as the new normal modes of a given material or structure arising from the strong coupling of the bare modes, which are the photon and the dipolar oscillation. The polariton is a bosonic quasiparticle, and should not be confused with the polaron (a fermionic quasiparticle), which is an electron plus an attached phonon cloud.

Whenever the polariton picture is valid (i.e., when the weak coupling limit is an invalid approximation), the model of photons propagating freely in crystals is insufficient. A major feature of polaritons is a strong dependency of the propagation speed of light through the crystal on the frequency of the photon. For exciton-polaritons, a wealth of experimental results on various aspects have been gained in the case of copper(I) oxide.

History 
Oscillations in ionized gases were observed by Lewi Tonks and Irving Langmuir in 1929. Polaritons were first considered theoretically by Kirill Borisovich Tolpygo. They were termed light-excitons in Soviet scientific literature. That name was suggested by Solomon Isaakovich Pekar, but the term polariton, proposed by John Hopfield, was adopted. Coupled states of electromagnetic waves and phonons in ionic crystals and their dispersion relation, now known as phonon polaritons, were obtained by Tolpygo in 1950 and, independently, by Huang Kun in 1951.  Collective interactions were published by David Pines and David Bohm in 1952, and plasmons were described in silver by Herbert Fröhlich and H. Pelzer in 1955. R.H Ritchie predicted surface plasmons in 1957, then Ritchie and H.B. Eldridge published experiments and predictions of emitted photons from irradiated metal foils in 1962.  Otto first published on surface plasmon-polaritons in 1968.
Room-temperature superfluidity of polaritons was observed in 2016 by Giovanni Lerario et al., at CNR NANOTEC Institute of Nanotechnology, using an organic microcavity supporting stable Frenkel exciton-polaritons at room temperature. In February 2018, scientists reported the discovery of a new three-photon form of light, which may involve polaritons, that could be useful in the development of quantum computers.

Types
A polariton is the result of the combination of a photon with a polar excitation in a material. The following are types of polaritons:
 Phonon polaritons result from coupling of an infrared photon with an optical phonon; 
 Exciton polaritons result from coupling of visible light with an exciton;
 Intersubband polaritons result from coupling of an infrared or terahertz photon with an intersubband excitation;
 Surface plasmon polaritons result from coupling of surface plasmons with light (the wavelength depends on the substance and its geometry); 
 Bragg polaritons ("Braggoritons") result from coupling of Bragg photon modes with bulk excitons;
 Plexcitons result from coupling plasmons with excitons;
 Magnon polaritons result from coupling of magnon with light;
 pi-tons result from coupling of alternating charge or spin fluctuations with light, distinctly different from magnon or exciton polaritons; 
 Cavity polaritons.

See also
Atomic coherence
Polariton laser
Polariton superfluid
Polaritonics

References

Further reading

External links
 YouTube animation explaining what is polariton in a semiconductor micro-resonator.
 Description of the experimental research on polariton fluids at the Institute of Nanotechnologies.

Quasiparticles